Saint Piran or Pyran, died c. 480, was a 5th-century Cornish abbot and saint, possibly of Irish origin. He is the patron saint of tin-miners, and is also generally regarded as the patron saint of Cornwall, although Saint Michael and Saint Petroc also have some claim to this title.

The consensus of scholarship has identified the "Life" of St Piran as a copy of that of the Irish saint Ciarán of Saigir with the names changed. While we cannot be certain of Piran’s origins, it is generally accepted that he was Irish, that he spent time in Wales and later was expelled from Ireland because of his powerful preaching of the Gospel of Jesus Christ. Having been thrown into the sea tied to a mill stone, he miraculously arrived on the shores of Cornwall where he built his tiny oratory and continued his work of evangelism, founding communities.

Saint Piran's Flag, a white cross on a black background, is the Cornish national flag. Saint Piran's Day falls on 5 March.

Suggested Irish origins
Piran is the most famous of all the saints said to have come to Cornwall from Ireland. By at least the 13th century, since Brittonic languages and Goidelic languages regularly alternate p and k sounds (see the classification of Celtic languages for an explanation), he had become identified as the Irish Saint Ciarán of Saigir who founded the monastery at Seir-Kieran in County Offaly.

The Celtic Scholar Charles Plummer suggested that Ciaran of Clonmacnoise was the patron saint of Cornwall Saint Piran, challenging the more broadly accepted belief that he was Ciaran of Saigir. The difference in spelling is for dialect or linguistical reasons between the two Insular Celtic languages. Brytonic was categorized as P-Celtic, as it replaced the harder 'c' or k sound in the Goidelic languages with the softer letter 'p'. On the other hand, Goidelic was seen by scholars as being Q-Celtic, as one of the earliest Ogham inscriptions used a 'Q' represented by Queirt, which was symbolised by the Apple Tree to phonetically pronounce the k sound, although Q was later replaced by the letter 'C' in the Old Irish alphabet.

The fourteenth-century Life of Saint Piran, probably written at Exeter Cathedral, is a complete copy of an earlier Middle Irish life of Saint Ciarán of Saighir, with different parentage and a different ending that takes into account Piran's works in Cornwall, and especially details of his death and the movements of his Cornish shrine; thus "excising the passages which speak of his burial at Saighir" (Doble).  However, there is no shrine to him in Ireland.

5 March is the traditional feast day of both St Ciarán of Saighir and St Piran. However the Calendar of Launceston Church records an alternative date of 18 November for the latter. In Perranzabuloe parish Perran Feast is traditionally celebrated on the last Monday in October. On the previous Sunday there are services at the site of St Piran's Oratory and in the parish church of St Piran.

Views from modern scholars 
 Charles Plummer suggested that St Piran might, instead, be identified with St Ciarán of Clonmacnoise, who founded the monastery of Clonmacnoise also in County Offaly, but this is doubtful since this saint is believed to have died of yellow fever at the age of thirty-two and was buried at Clonmacnoise. His father is, however, sometimes said to have been a Cornishman.
 Joseph Loth, moreover, has argued, on detailed philological grounds, that the two names could not possibly be identical.
 G. H. Doble thought that Piran was a Welshman from Glamorgan, citing the lost chapel once dedicated to him in Cardiff.
 David Nash Ford accepts the Ciarán of Clonmacnoise identification, whilst further suggesting that Piran's father in the Exeter life, Domuel, be identified with Dywel ab Erbin, a fifth-century prince of Dumnonia (Devon and Cornwall).
 The St Piran Trust has undertaken research which suggests that St Piran was either St Ciarán of Saighir or a disciple, as indicated by Dr James Brennan of Kilkenny and Dr T. F. G. Dexter, whose thesis is held in the Royal Cornwall Museum.
 Professor Nicholas Orme writes in his Churches of Medieval Exeter, that "it may well be that Piran was the inspiration for the Kerrian dedication (in Exeter), albeit believed (as Piran usually was) to be identical with Ciarán." Also, the saint of the church in Exeter was Keranus or Kyeranus [Queranus] in Latin documents, with Kerrian being the local vernacular pronunciation.

Legends

 The Irish tied him to a mill-stone, rolled it over the edge of a cliff into a stormy sea, which immediately became calm, and the saint floated safely over the water to land upon the sandy beach of Perranzabuloe in Cornwall. His first disciples are said to have been a badger, a fox, and a bear
 He landed in Cornwall, and there established himself as a hermit. His sanctity and his austerity won for him the veneration of all around, and the gift of miracles, with which he was favoured, brought many to seek his charitable aid.
 He was joined at Perranzabuloe by many of his Christian converts and together they founded the Abbey of Lanpiran, with Piran as abbot.
 St Piran 'rediscovered' tin-smelting (tin had been smelted in Cornwall since before the Romans' arrival, but the methods had since been lost) when his black hearthstone, which was evidently a slab of tin-bearing ore, had the tin smelt out of it and rise to the top in the form of a white cross (thus the image on the flag).

Death and veneration

Piran was reportedly executed by Theodoric or Tador, King of
Cornwall in 480, about the time of Vortigern (Usher's Prim. 869). It is also said that at his death, the remains of the Blessed Martin the Abbot which he had brought from Ireland were buried with him at Perranzabuloe.

His own remains were subsequently exhumed and redistributed to be venerated in various reliquaries. Exeter Cathedral was reputed to be the possessor of one of his arms, while according to an inventory, St Piran's Old Church, Perranzabuloe, had a reliquary containing his head and also a hearse in which his body was placed for processionals. In 1443, Cornish nobleman, Sir John Arundell bequeathed money in his Will for the preservation of the head of St Piran in the chapel at Perranzabuloe.

The churches at Perranuthnoe and Perranarworthal were dedicated to Piran and holy wells at Perranwell and Probus, Cornwall are named after him. In Brittany St. Peran, Loperan and Saint-Perran are also named after him. The former Methodist chapel at Laity Moor has served as the Orthodox Church of Archangel Michael and Holy Piran since 1996.

The earliest documented link to the design of the St Piran's Flag with St Piran is on the coat of arms of the de Saint-Péran or Saint-Pezran (pronounced Péran) family from Cornouaille in Brittany. The earliest evidence known comes from the 15th century, with the arms being De sable à la croix pattée d'argent. (a black shield with a white cross pattée).

Mount St. Piran is a mountain in Banff National Park near Lake Louise, Alberta, Canada, named after the saint. St Piran's crab, Clibanarius erythropus, was also named in his honour, in 2016.

St Piran's Day

St Piran's Day on 5 March is popular in Cornwall and the term 'Perrantide' has been coined to describe the week prior to this day. Many Cornish-themed events occur in the Duchy and also in areas in which there is a large community descended from Cornish emigrants. The village of Perranporth ('Porthpyran' in Cornish) hosts the annual inter-Celtic festival of 'Lowender Peran', which is also named in honour of him.

The largest St Piran's Day event is the march across the dunes to St Piran's cross which hundreds of people attend, generally dressed in black, white and gold, and carrying the Cornish Flag. A play of the Life of St Piran, in Cornish, has been enacted since 2000 at the event. Daffodils are also carried and placed at the cross. Daffodils also feature in celebrations in Truro, most likely due to their 'gold' colour. Black, white and gold are colours associated with Cornwall due to St Piran's Flag (black and white), and the Duchy Shield (gold coins on black).

In 2006 Cornish MP Dan Rogerson asked the government to make 5 March a public holiday in Cornwall to recognise celebrations for St Piran's Day.
In 2010, a short movie about St. Piran was made and premiered at the Heartland Film Festival.

See also

 Mount St. Piran
 Piran (Slovenia)
 Saint Piran, patron saint archive
 St Piran Football League
 St Piran's (school)

Notes

References

Sources
 Carter, Eileen. (2001). In the Shadow of St Piran
 Doble, G. H. (1965). The Saints of Cornwall. Dean & Chapter of Truro.
 Loth, J. (1930). 'Quelques victimes de l'hagio-onomastique en Cornwall: saint Peran, saint Keverne, saint Achebran' in Mémoires de la Société d'Histoire et d'Archéologie de Bretagne.
 Plummer, Charles. (1922). Betha Naem nErenn
 Tomlin, E. W. F. (1982). In Search of St Piran
 Rev. Charles William Boase, M.A. (Fellow and Tutor of Exeter College, Oxford). PIRANUS, ST. In: William Smith and Henry Wace. A Dictionary of Christian Biography, Literature, Sects and Doctrines During the First Eight Centuries. Volume IV: N-Z. London: John Murray, Albemarle Street, 1887. pp. 404–405.

Further reading
 "A man of the people who liked his pint... no wonder Piran is Cornwall's hero." Europe Intelligence Wire 21 February 2012.
 Eileen Carter. In the shadow of Saint Piran, AD 500-2000: The history of the Saint and his foundations at Perranzabuloe. Wadebridge: Lodenek, 2001. 90 pages. 
 Eric Walter Frederick Tomlin. In search of St. Piran: An Account of His Monastic Foundation at Perranzabuloe, Cornwall, and Its Place in the Western Or Celtic Church and Society. Padstow, Cornwall: Lodenek Press, 1982. 41 pages. 
 William Haslam (Rev). St. Piran & His Oratory: The History of a Celtic Saint. Penzance: Oakmagic Publications, 1998, 1845. 58 pages. 
 William Haslam (Rev). Perran-Zabuloe: With an Account of the Past and Present State of the Oratory of St. Piran in the Sands. London: John Van Voorst, Paternoster, 1844. 181 pages. (see: Chapter II, pp. 53-56).
 Anthony Allen Clinnick. The Story of the Three Churches of St. Piran, the miners' patron saint of Cornwall. A.W. Jordan: Truro, 1936. 15 pages.
 George Basil Barham. How St. Piran came to Cornwall. [London]: Great Western Railway (Great Britain), 1922. 4 unnumbered pages.

External links

  St Piran's holiday. BBC News. 2 March 2006, 12:19 GMT.
  St. Piran's events. An Daras: The Cornish Folk Arts Project.
  St. Piran's celebrations. BBC Home.
  St. Piran's Day in Truro. BBC Home.
 St. Piran's Oratory – Morley B Collins, 1910
  St Piran Trust website.
 The Orthodox Church of Archangel Michael and Holy Piran. Laity Moor, Nr Ponsanooth, Cornwall. TR3 7HR.
 The medieval life of St Piran - Latin text and English translation.

6th-century Irish abbots
6th-century Christian saints
Burials in Cornwall
Cornish culture
Cornish nationalism
Irish expatriates in England
Medieval Irish saints of Cornwall
Medieval Cornish saints
Tin mining
Miracle workers